The NWT Human Rights Commission is an independent body which is responsible for a number of duties under the NWT Human Rights Act (HRA).

History
In 2004, the Commission was established by the enactment of the NWT Human Rights Act. The Human Rights Act is the successor legislation to the Fair Practices Act. The enactment of the Act brought NWT in line with other jurisdictions which have comprehensive human rights legislative regimes.

Structure and Function of the Commission
The Commission itself is composed of two distinct yet overlapping entities which are collectively known as the Commission.

Members of the Commission are appointed by the Northwest Territories Legislative Assembly for a term of four years. These members collectively have a set of roles and responsibilities.

The Director is an officer of the Commission and is also appointed by the legislature for a four-year term. The Director is responsible for carrying out instructions given by the Commission, but also has a completely separate and independent mandate which is outside the role of the members of the Commission.

The Commission
The Commission is responsible for the following:
Promoting awareness and understanding of the HRA
Educating key stakeholders of relevant human rights issues
Approving the annual budget
Determining when the Commission should be directly involved in an adjudication of great public significance

The Director
The Director is responsible for the following:
Carrying out instructions from the Commission which fall under their mandate
Hiring and managing staff of the Commission
Investigating individual complaints
Referring individual complaints to adjudication

Adjudication
The Commission does not render decisions on the merits of individual complaints. The responsibility of adjudicating disputes rests with the Northwest Territories Human Rights Adjudication Panel, a totally separate entity.

Key Publications
The Commission provides a variety of publication in many different languages and alternative formats.
Know Your Rights
 
This is a comprehensive, plain language guide providing a complete overview of the HRA

References

External links
 Human Rights Commission Official Website
 Human Rights Adjudication Panel

Organizations based in the Northwest Territories